Georges-Isidore Delisle was a politician in Quebec, Canada.  He served as Member of the Legislative Assembly.

Early life

He was born on June 30, 1856 in Sherbrooke, Eastern Townships.

Provincial politics

Delisle was elected as a Liberal candidate to the Legislative Assembly of Quebec in 1908, representing the district of Saint-Maurice.  He was re-elected in 1912, 1916 and 1919.

Death

He died in office on March 26, 1920.

References

1856 births
1920 deaths
Quebec Liberal Party MNAs